The Copa Libertadores 1976 was the 17th edition of the Copa Libertadores, CONMEBOL's annual international club tournament. The tournament began on February 23 and ended on July 30.

Cruzeiro won the competition, being the first Brazilian team, after Pelé's Santos, to win the continental competition. During the tournament, Cruzeiro suffered a great setback: the loss of the player Roberto Batata, who died in a car accident.

Qualified teams

The participating teams were divided into five groups, in which teams of the same country were placed in the same group. Each country was represented by two teams. The countries were paired as follows:

Group 1:  and 
Group 2:  and 
Group 3:  and 
Group 4:  and 
Group 5:  and

Group stage

Group 1 (Argentina, Venezuela)

Group 2 (Bolivia, Ecuador)

Group 3 (Brazil, Paraguay)

Group 4 (Colombia, Peru)

Group 5 (Chile, Uruguay)

1st Place Playoff

Semi-finals

Group 1

Group 2

Playoffs

Finals

External links
Eternal matches: Cruzeiro 5x4 Internacional, in Portuguese
Cruzeiro 3x2 River Plate, in Portuguese 
In English
Match result at RSSSF's website

1
Copa Libertadores seasons